CFAP47, or cilia and flagella associated protein 47, is a human gene encoded on the X chromosome. in humans.

Protein 
CXorf59 is most commonly known as Cilia- and flagella- associated protein 47 (CFAP47) in other species.

Gene 
CFAP47 is a 3187 amino acid protein that has seven splice variants and contains 64 exons. Genecard listed aliases for CXorf59 as Cilia and Flagella Associated Protein 47 (CFAP47), Calponin Homology Domain-Containing Protein 2 (CHDC2), FLJ3660, CXorf22, and CXorf30

Orthologs and paralogs 
Orthologs have been found in mammalia, aves, reptilia, amphibia, osteichthyes; sarcopterygii and actinopterygii, ascidiacea, gastropoda, cephalopoda, insecta, and demospongiae. There are no paralogs within the human genome.

Expression  

CXorf59 is a protein coding gene that is confirmed to be expressed in 27 different tissues. The liver, testis, thyroid, brain, and endometrium were higher in reads per kilobase of transcript (RPKM). While this gene is associated with cilia and flagella, there is no current functional information available on this protein. CXorf59 is also related to Calponin, a calcium binding protein. In the 324 to 403 base pair region, there is a Calponin homology domain. Calponin homology domains are found in cytoskeletal and signal transduction proteins. They are composed of four alpha helices and are actin-binding.

References 

Genes on human chromosome X
Human proteins